Prerna Wanvari is an Indian  actor. She has acted in TV shows, like Bandini, Koi Aane Ko Hai,  Adalat, Gumrah: End of Innocence, Sapna Babul Ka...Bidaai and Parichay. She presented the Arts Programming Award at the International Emmy Awards Gala which was held at New York's Hilton Hotel on November 2012. She is the daughter of the 22 year old Indiantelevision.com group founder, CEO and editor in chief  Anil NM Wanvari and Satya Wanvari - a journalist, film critic, and scriptwriter.

Television
2009 Koi Aane Ko Hai as Neelam and Ratna- Double Role 
2010 Sapna Babul Ka...Bidaai as Shivani
2009–11 Bandini as Kadambari
2011 Gumrah: End of Innocence as Simran
2011-13 Parichay as Raveena Chopra Grewal
2013–14 Adaalat as Sunaina
2015 Aahat (TV series) as Manisha
2015 Pyaar Tune Kya Kiya (TV series) as Varsha
2015 Tujhse Naaraz Nahi Zindagi as Zeenat Sheikh 
2015 Gumrah: End of Innocence 
2015 Code Red
2016 24 (Indian TV series Season 2) in an extended cameo role.
2017 Chandrakanta as Vishakha/ Mayavi, a skilled and powerful sorceress (ayyara)
 2022 Bohot Pyaar Karte Hai as Kadambari Patel

Reality television
2009-11 Nachle Ve with Saroj Khan - Season 2
Nachle Ve with Saroj Khan & Terence Lewis - Season 3 (Prerna Wanvari)

Feature films
2015 P Se PM Tak as Rashmi

2017 Habib Faisal's untitled next as Pratibha. A Yash Raj Films Production

References

External links

Living people
Place of birth missing (living people)
Indian television actresses
1989 births